Chocolate (or El Chocolate) is a populated place in the municipality of Linares, Nuevo León, Mexico.

References

Populated places in Nuevo León